Edith Meinhard was a German actress who appeared in more than fifty films during her career including the 1929 film Diary of a Lost Girl.

Life and Work
Little is known about Edith Meinhard, although in the 1930s she was one of the busiest actresses in Germany. She made her silent film debut at the age of 10. A few years later, the Defu production company hired her for two silent films. In 1929 she appeared as Erika, the friend of Thymian (Louise Brooks), in G. W. Pabst's critically acclaimed film Diary of a Lost Girl.

Her transition to sound film went smoothly, and Edith Meinhard played a wide range of supporting roles, including prostitutes, secretaries and maids, until the outbreak of the war in 1939. Edith Meinhard's last film was made in the spring of 1943, shortly before the heavy Allied bombing of Berlin began. She has never been heard of since then, and may not have survived the Second World War.

Selected filmography
 Knights of the Night (1928)
 Men Without Work (1929)
 The Veil Dancer (1929)
 Diary of a Lost Girl (1929)
 The Man in the Dark (1930)
 Inquest (1931)
 Rasputin, Demon with Women (1932)
 The Invisible Front (1932)
 Gypsy Blood (1934)
 Knockout (1935)
 Game on Board (1936)
 The Empress's Favourite (1936)
 The Irresistible Man (1937)
 Talking About Jacqueline (1937)
 The Blue Fox (1938)
 Covered Tracks (1938)
 The Night of Decision (1938)
 The Leghorn Hat (1939)
 We Danced Around the World (1939)

References

Bibliography

External links

1908 births
Year of death missing
German film actresses
German silent film actresses
20th-century German actresses
Actresses from Berlin